, also known as , was the fifth shōgun of the Kamakura shogunate of Japan.  His father was the 4th Kamakura shōgun, Kujō Yoritsune.

Yoritsugu was a member of the great Fujiwara clan. The Kujō family was one of the five branches of the historically powerful Fujiwara clan of courtiers.

Family
 Father: Kujō Yoritsune
 Mother: Omiya no Kata
 Wife: Hiwadahime (1230–1247)

Events of Yoritsugu shogunate 
 1244 (Kangen 2): In the spring of this year, a number of extraordinary phenomena in the skies over Kamakura troubled Yoritsugu's father Yoritsune deeply.
 1244 (Kangen 2, 4th month): Yoritsugu had his coming-of-age ceremonies at age 6.  In the same month, his father asked Emperor Go-Saga for permission to give up his responsibilities as shogun in favor of Yoritsugu.
 1245 (Kangen 3, 7th month):  Yoritsune shaved his head and became a Buddhist priest.
 1246 (Kangen 4, 7th month): Yoritsugu married the sister of Hōjō Tsunetoki. He was seven and she was sixteen.
 September 1, 1256 (Kōgen 1, 11th day of the 8th month): Yoritsugu's father died at age 39.
 October 14, 1256 (Kōgen 1, 24th day of the 9th month): Yoritsugu died at the age of 18 years.

Eras of Yoritsugu's shogunate 
The years in which Yoritsugu was shogun are more specifically identified by more than one era name or nengō.
 Kangen             (1243–1247)
 Hōji          (1247–1249)
 Kenchō      (1249–1257)

Notes

References
 Nussbaum, Louis-Frédéric and Käthe Roth. (2005).  Japan encyclopedia. Cambridge: Harvard University Press. ;  OCLC 58053128
 Titsingh, Isaac. (1834). Nihon Ōdai Ichiran; ou,  Annales des empereurs du Japon.  Paris: Royal Asiatic Society, Oriental Translation Fund of Great Britain and Ireland. OCLC 5850691.

1239 births
1256 deaths
13th-century Japanese people
13th-century shōguns
Kamakura shōguns
Fujiwara clan
Kujō family
People of Kamakura-period Japan
People from Kamakura